All The Rage is the fourth volume in a series of Repairman Jack books written by American author F. Paul Wilson. The book was first published by Gauntlet Press in a signed limited first edition (July 2000) then later as a trade hardcover from Forge (November 2000) and as a mass market paperback from Forge (September 2000).

Reviewer Charles de Lint recommended All the Rage as "a hardboiled mystery, with a dash of the supernatural and a good helping of suspense and action."

Reception

2000 American novels
Repairman Jack (series)